Calle Rosén (born 2 February 1994) is a Swedish professional ice hockey defenceman currently playing for the  St. Louis Blues of the National Hockey League (NHL).

Playing career
Rosén played as a youth with Frölunda HC before making his professional debut on loan from Frölunda with Karlskrona HK then of the HockeyAllsvenskan. Unable to make a senior appearance with Frölunda, on 3 July 2014, Rosén signed with his hometown club, Växjö Lakers of the Swedish Hockey League (SHL).

In late April 2017, rumours began to circulate that Rosén was being pursued by various National Hockey League teams as a free agent, headlined by two strong pushes from the Toronto Maple Leafs and Chicago Blackhawks. Soon thereafter, on 16 May, it was announced Rosén signed a two-year, entry-level contract with the Maple Leafs, alongside fellow Swedish defenceman Andreas Borgman.

In the 2017–18 season, on 6 October 2017, Rosén was re-called to the Maple Leafs from the American Hockey League (AHL)'s Toronto Marlies after Martin Marinčin was loaned to the Marlies. Rosén was reassigned to Marlies on 23 October 2017 after earning one assist in four games. However, he was recalled back to the NHL on a short-lived emergency basis on 13 March 2018, along with teammate Andreas Johnsson only to be returned the next day.

During the 2018–19 season, while playing on assignment with the Toronto Marlies, Rosén signed a two-year, one-way, $1.5 million contract extension with the Maple Leafs on 10 December 2018. Rosén was called up to the Leafs on 31 March 2019, and he recorded his first NHL goal the following day in a game against the New York Islanders. In doing so, the Leafs won 2–1 and clinched a playoff spot.

On 1 July 2019, Rosén, along with Nazem Kadri and a third-round pick in the 2020 NHL Entry Draft, was traded by the Maple Leafs to the Colorado Avalanche in exchange for Tyson Barrie, Alexander Kerfoot and a sixth-round pick in 2020.

After attending the Avalanche 2019 training camp, Rosén was among the last cuts reassigned to begin the 2019–20 season with AHL affiliate, the Colorado Eagles. After 13 games with the Eagles, Rosén received his first recall to the Avalanche and made his debut, registering an assist, in a 4–1 victory over the Edmonton Oilers on 27 November 2019. In a third-pairing role, he added 2 assists through 8 games before he was returned to the AHL. With an expanded role with the Colorado Eagles, Rosén was unable to match his previous seasons offensive totals, recording 3 goals and 15 points through 35 games. At the NHL trade deadline, he was re-acquired by the Toronto Maple Leafs in exchange for goaltender Michael Hutchinson on 24 February 2020. He was immediately assigned to report to former AHL club, the Toronto Marlies, however before appearing with the Marlies was recalled to the Maple Leafs, after an injury to fellow defenseman Jake Muzzin.

Having concluded his contract with the Maple Leafs, on 30 July 2021, Rosén was signed as a free agent to a one-year, two-way contract with the St. Louis Blues.

Rosén scored his first two goals with St. Louis in a 8-3 win over the Nashville Predators on 17 April 2022, while also adding an assist.

Career statistics

Awards and honours

References

External links

1994 births
Living people
Colorado Avalanche players
Colorado Eagles players
Swedish expatriate ice hockey players in Canada
Swedish expatriate ice hockey players in the United States
Karlskrona HK players
Rögle BK players
Springfield Thunderbirds players
St. Louis Blues players
Swedish ice hockey defencemen
Toronto Maple Leafs players
Toronto Marlies players
Undrafted National Hockey League players
Växjö Lakers players
People from Växjö
Sportspeople from Kronoberg County